Tuxpan de Bolaños is a Huichol settlement in the Bolaños Municipality of Jalisco, Mexico. In the Huichol language, its name is Kuruxi Manúka. The population is 1269, according to INEGI 2010. Per the Huichol people, the population of Tuxpan de Bolaños is roughly 2,000 people.

Other communities belonging to the same culture are: Santa Catarina Cuexcomatitlan (Tuapurie), San Sebastian Teponahuaxtlán (Wautia), San Andres Cohamiata (Tatei Kie), and San Miguel Huaixtita (Tsikwaita), within the state of Jalisco, and Guadalupe Ocotán (Xatsitsarie) in the state of Nayarit.

References 

Populated places in Jalisco
Huichol